Leon Howard may refer to:
 Lee Howard (journalist) (1914–1978), British newspaper editor
 Leon Howard (South Carolina politician) (born 1955), American politician
 Leon Howard (Tennessee politician) (1849–1912), American politician
 Leon Howard (scholar), scholar of American literature and Herman Melville biographer